"Bush Party" is a song written and recorded by Canadian country music artist Dean Brody. It was the lead single from Brody's sixth studio album Beautiful Freakshow.

Critical reception
Dutch Bickell of Canadian Beats Media called the track a "Friday night anthem", saying it is a "sing along at the top of your lungs kind of tune". Sound Check Entertainment said the song "will get your foot stompin'".

Commercial performance
"Bush Party" debuted as the most-added song of the week on Canadian country radio. It would reach a peak of number 6 on the Billboard Canada Country chart, marking Brody's nineteenth Top 10 hit. The song was certified Platinum by Music Canada.

Music video
The official music video for "Bush Party" premiered on August 8, 2016. It features Brody and his friends crashing an art gallery.

Charts

Certifications

References

2016 songs
2016 singles
Dean Brody songs
Songs written by Dean Brody
Open Road Recordings singles